Peter Lei Wang-Kei 李宏基主教 (March 29, 1922 – July 23, 1974) was the fourth Roman Catholic bishop of Hong Kong.

Born in Nam Hoi, Lei was ordained priest on 6 July 1955 and Appointed Auxiliary Bishop of Hong Kong 3 July 1971, appointed Titular Bishop of Octaba 8 September 1971.

He was sworn in as the Vicar Capitular on May 23, 1973. Appointed Bishop of Hong Kong on December 21, 1973 and installed on April 22, 1974, he died not long afterwards on July 23, 1974 of sudden heart attack.

See also
Catholic Diocese of Hong Kong

External links
His Biography by the Catholic Church

Roman Catholic bishops of Hong Kong
20th-century Roman Catholic bishops in Hong Kong
1922 births
1974 deaths
Cantonese people
People from Guangzhou
20th-century Roman Catholic titular bishops